Main page: List of Canadian plants by family

Families:
A | B | C | D | E | F | G | H | I J K | L | M | N | O | P Q | R | S | T | U V W | X Y Z

Lamiaceae 

 Agastache foeniculum — blue giant-hyssop
 Agastache nepetoides — yellow giant-hyssop
 Agastache urticifolia — nettleleaf giant-hyssop
 Blephilia ciliata — downy woodmint
 Blephilia hirsuta — hairy woodmint
 Clinopodium arkansanum — low calamint
 Clinopodium douglasii — Douglas' savoury
 Clinopodium vulgare — field basil
 Collinsonia canadensis — Canada horsebalm
 Dracocephalum parviflorum — American dragonhead
 Hedeoma hispida — rough false pennyroyal
 Hedeoma pulegioides — American false pennyroyal
 Lycopus americanus — American bugleweed
 Lycopus asper — rough bugleweed
 Lycopus laurentianus — St. Lawrence water-horehound
 Lycopus rubellus — taperleaf bugleweed
 Lycopus uniflorus — northern bugleweed
 Lycopus virginicus — Virginia bugleweed
 Lycopus x sherardii
 Mentha arvensis — corn mint
 Mentha canadensis — Canadian mint
 Monarda didyma — Oswego-tea
 Monarda fistulosa — wild bergamot beebalm
 Monarda media — purple bergamot
 Monarda punctata — spotted beebalm
 Monardella odoratissima — mountain wildmint
 Physostegia ledinghamii — Ledingham's physostegia
 Physostegia parviflora — purple dragonhead
 Physostegia virginiana — false dragonhead
 Prunella vulgaris — self-heal
 Pycnanthemum incanum — hoary mountainmint
 Pycnanthemum tenuifolium — slender mountainmint
 Pycnanthemum verticillatum — whorled mountainmint
 Scutellaria angustifolia — narrowleaf skullcap
 Scutellaria galericulata — hooded skullcap
 Scutellaria lateriflora — mad-dog skullcap
 Scutellaria nervosa — veined skullcap
 Scutellaria parvula — small skullcap
 Scutellaria x churchilliana — Churchill's skullcap
 Stachys chamissonis — coastal hedge-nettle
 Stachys mexicana — Mexican hedge-nettle
 Stachys palustris — marsh hedge-nettle
 Stachys pilosa — hairy hedge-nettle
 Stachys tenuifolia — smooth hedge-nettle
 Teucrium canadense — American germander
 Trichostema brachiatum — false pennyroyal
 Trichostema dichotomum — forked bluecurls
 Trichostema oblongum — mountain bluecurls

Lauraceae 

 Lindera benzoin — spicebush
 Sassafras albidum — sassafras

Lejeuneaceae 

 Cololejeunea biddlecomiae
 Cololejeunea macounii
 Lejeunea alaskana
 Lejeunea cavifolia

Lemnaceae 

 Lemna minor — lesser duckweed
 Lemna trisulca — star duckweed
 Lemna turionifera — turion duckweed
 Spirodela polyrrhiza — common water-flaxseed
 Wolffia arrhiza — spotless water-flaxseed
 Wolffia borealis — dotted watermeal
 Wolffia brasiliensis — pointed watermeal
 Wolffia columbiana — Columbian watermeal

Lentibulariaceae 

 Pinguicula macroceras — California butterwort
 Pinguicula villosa — hairy butterwort
 Pinguicula vulgaris — common butterwort
 Utricularia cornuta — horned bladderwort
 Utricularia geminiscapa — hidden-fruit bladderwort
 Utricularia gibba — humped bladderwort
 Utricularia intermedia — flatleaf bladderwort
 Utricularia macrorhiza — greater bladderwort
 Utricularia minor — lesser bladderwort
 Utricularia ochroleuca — northern bladderwort
 Utricularia purpurea — purple bladderwort
 Utricularia radiata — small swollen bladderwort
 Utricularia resupinata — northeastern bladderwort
 Utricularia subulata — zigzag bladderwort

Lepidoziaceae 

 Bazzania ambigua
 Bazzania denudata — bazzania lichen
 Bazzania pearsonii
 Bazzania tricrenata
 Bazzania trilobata — three-lobed bazzania
 Kurzia pauciflora
 Kurzia setacea
 Kurzia sylvatica
 Lepidozia filamentosa
 Lepidozia reptans
 Lepidozia sandvicensis

Leptodontaceae 

 Forsstroemia trichomitria

Leskeaceae 

 Bryohaplocladium microphyllum
 Bryohaplocladium virginianum
 Claopodium bolanderi
 Claopodium crispifolium
 Claopodium pellucinerve
 Claopodium whippleanum
 Lescuraea saxicola
 Leskea gracilescens
 Leskea obscura
 Leskea polycarpa
 Leskeella nervosa
 Lindbergia brachyptera — Lindberg's maple-moss
 Pseudoleskea atricha
 Pseudoleskea baileyi
 Pseudoleskea incurvata
 Pseudoleskea julacea
 Pseudoleskea patens
 Pseudoleskea radicosa
 Pseudoleskea stenophylla
 Pseudoleskeella sibirica
 Pseudoleskeella tectorum

Leucobryaceae 

 Leucobryum glaucum — pincushion moss

Leucodontaceae 

 Alsia californica
 Antitrichia californica
 Antitrichia curtipendula
 Dendroalsia abietina
 Leucodon brachypus
 Leucodon julaceus

Liliaceae 

 Aletris farinosa — white-tubed colicroot
 Allium acuminatum — tapertip onion
 Allium amplectens — paper onion
 Allium burdickii — narrowleaf wild leek
 Allium canadense — meadow onion
 Allium cernuum — nodding onion
 Allium crenulatum — Olympic onion
 Allium geyeri — Geyer's onion
 Allium schoenoprasum — wild chives
 Allium stellatum — glade onion
 Allium textile — white wild onion
 Allium tricoccum — small white leek
 Allium validum — tall swamp onion
 Brodiaea coronaria — harvest firecracker-flower
 Calochortus apiculatus — Baker's mariposa lily
 Calochortus lyallii — Lyall's mariposa lily
 Calochortus macrocarpus — greenband mariposa lily
 Camassia leichtlinii — Leichtlin's camassia
 Camassia quamash — common camassia
 Camassia scilloides — wild hyacinth
 Chamaelirium luteum — Devil's-bit
 Clintonia borealis — blue bead-lily
 Clintonia uniflora — single-flowered clintonia
 Erythronium albidum — white trout-lily
 Erythronium americanum — yellow trout-lily
 Erythronium grandiflorum — largeflower yellow fawnlily
 Erythronium montanum — glacier fawnlily
 Erythronium oregonum — giant fawnlily
 Erythronium revolutum — pink fawnlily
 Fritillaria affinis — Ojai fritillary
 Fritillaria camschatcensis — Indian rice
 Fritillaria pudica — yellow mission-bells
 Gagea serotina (syn. Lloydia serotina) — common alpine-lily
 Hypoxis hirsuta — eastern yellow stargrass
 Lilium canadense — Canada lily
 Lilium columbianum — Columbian lily
 Lilium michiganense — Michigan lily
 Lilium philadelphicum — wood lily
 Lophiola aurea — golden crest
 Maianthemum canadense — wild lily-of-the-valley
 Maianthemum dilatatum — false lily-of-the-valley
 Maianthemum racemosum — Solomon's-plume
 Maianthemum stellatum — starflowered Solomon's-plume
 Maianthemum trifolium — three-leaf Solomon's-plume
 Medeola virginiana — Indian cucumber-root
 Nothoscordum bivalve — crow-poison
 Polygonatum biflorum — common Solomon's-seal
 Polygonatum pubescens — downy Solomon's-seal
 Prosartes hookeri — Hooker's mandarin
 Prosartes lanuginosa — yellow mandarin
 Prosartes smithii — Smith's fairy-bells
 Prosartes trachycarpa — rough-fruited mandarin
 Stenanthium occidentale — western featherbells
 Streptopus amplexifolius — clasping twisted-stalk
 Streptopus lanceolatus — rosy twisted-stalk
 Streptopus streptopoides — small twisted-stalk
 Streptopus x oreopolus — hybrid twisted-stalk
 Tofieldia coccinea — northern false-asphodel
 Tofieldia pusilla — Scotch false-asphodel
 Triantha glutinosa — sticky bog-asphodel
 Triantha occidentalis — western false-asphodel
 Trillium cernuum — nodding trillium
 Trillium erectum — ill-scent trillium
 Trillium flexipes — nodding trillium
 Trillium grandiflorum — white trillium
 Trillium ovatum — western trillium
 Trillium undulatum — painted trillium
 Triteleia grandiflora — largeflower triteleia
 Triteleia hyacinthina — white triteleia
 Uvularia grandiflora — largeflower bellwort
 Uvularia perfoliata — perfoliate bellwort
 Uvularia sessilifolia — sessile-leaf bellwort
 Veratrum viride — American false hellebore
 Xerophyllum tenax — western turkeybeard
 Zigadenus elegans — white camas
 Zigadenus venenosus — meadow deathcamas

Limnanthaceae 

 Floerkea proserpinacoides — false mermaidweed
 Limnanthes macounii — Macoun's meadowfoam

Linaceae 

 Linum australe — southern flax
 Linum compactum — Wyoming flax
 Linum lewisii — prairie flax
 Linum medium — stiff yellow flax
 Linum rigidum — stiff-stem flax
 Linum striatum — ridged yellow flax
 Linum sulcatum — grooved yellow flax
 Linum virginianum — Virginia flax

Loasaceae 

 Mentzelia albicaulis — whitestem stickleaf
 Mentzelia decapetala — ten-petal stickleaf
 Mentzelia dispersa — Mada stickleaf
 Mentzelia laevicaulis — giant blazingstar
 Mentzelia veatchiana — Veatch's blazingstar

Lophocoleaceae 

 Chiloscyphus pallescens
 Chiloscyphus polyanthos
 Lophocolea bidentata
 Lophocolea heterophylla
 Lophocolea minor

Lycopodiaceae 

 Diphasiastrum alpinum — alpine clubmoss
 Diphasiastrum complanatum — trailing clubmoss
 Diphasiastrum digitatum — fan clubmoss
 Diphasiastrum sabinifolium — ground-fir
 Diphasiastrum sitchense — Alaskan clubmoss
 Diphasiastrum tristachyum — deeproot clubmoss
 Diphasiastrum x habereri
 Diphasiastrum x zeilleri
 Huperzia appressa — Appalachian fir-clubmoss
 Huperzia chinensis — Chinese clubmoss
 Huperzia haleakalae — Haleakalā fir-clubmoss
 Huperzia lucidula — shining clubmoss
 Huperzia occidentalis — western shining clubmoss
 Huperzia porophila — rock clubmoss
 Huperzia selago — fir clubmoss
 Huperzia x buttersii — Butters' clubmoss
 Lycopodiella appressa — southern bog clubmoss
 Lycopodiella inundata — bog clubmoss
 Lycopodium annotinum — stiff clubmoss
 Lycopodium clavatum — running-pine
 Lycopodium dendroideum — treelike clubmoss
 Lycopodium hickeyi — Hickey's clubmoss
 Lycopodium lagopus — one-cone ground-pine
 Lycopodium obscurum — tree clubmoss

Lythraceae 

 Ammannia robusta — grand redstem
 Decodon verticillatus — hairy swamp loosestrife
 Lythrum alatum — winged loosestrife
 Rotala ramosior — toothcup

Canada,family,L